Booué Airport  is an airport serving the town of Booué in the Ogooué-Ivindo Province of Gabon. The runway lies within a bend of the Ogooué River.

See also

 List of airports in Gabon
 Transport in Gabon

References

External links
The Margouilla - Booué
Booué Airport
OurAirports - Booué

Airports in Gabon